Leandro Emanuel Cuomo (born 16 January 1996) is an Argentine professional footballer who plays as a midfielder for Rivadavia.

Career
Cuomo's career started with Huracán. Juan Manuel Azconzábal moved him into their first-team in 2017, a year in which Cuomo was selected in a squad for Copa Sudamericana encounters with Venezuela's Deportivo Anzoátegui. He was an unused sub in the first leg on 1 March, which ended in a 3–0 defeat. Cuomo was selected to start the second leg in May, with the midfielder featuring for eighty-eight minutes whilst also scoring his first career goal as Huracán put four unanswered goals past Deportivo Anzoátegui to progress. June 2018 saw Cuomo agree to join Primera B Metropolitana team Sacachispas on loan.

Having appeared twenty-five times for Sacachispas, Cuomo returned to Huracán before eventually departing. A move to Rivadavia of Torneo Regional Federal Amateur soon followed in early 2020.

Career statistics
.

References

External links

1996 births
Living people
Sportspeople from Buenos Aires Province
Argentine footballers
Association football midfielders
Primera B Metropolitana players
Club Atlético Huracán footballers
Sacachispas Fútbol Club players
Rivadavia de Lincoln footballers